Teysi ng Tahanan was a Philippine daily morning talk show on ABS-CBN. It aired from January 14, 1991 to February 21, 1997. It was hosted by Tessie Tomas replacing Magandang Umaga Po when the timeslot was moved to 05:30 and replaced by Today with Kris Aquino.

The Teysi Tomas show was the first Morning program to also be shown internationally before the use of international programming the program aired internationally via TFC from (1994-1997) and its revived successor in (2003)

Overview
To distinguish each day that it aired, Mondays were designated as "occult days" with Madame Rosa as the in-house psychic for the segment Iparamdam kay Madam. Tuesdays and Thursdays, love and sex concerns were discussed with the irrepressible in-house sex-therapist Dr. Margie Holmes. Wednesdays were crime and current events days. And on Fridays, viewers were encouraged to send in their life stories to see their letters dramatized in the segment Kung Maibabalik Ko Lang (based on the 1987 song performed by Regine Velasquez-Alcasid from her album Regine).

The show became an instant hit, sweeping local awards and even "Hall of Fame" status from Gawad CCP, Catholic Mass Media, KBP Golden Dove and Star Awards for best talk show or best women's show categories. It garnered unprecedented ratings and became a top earner for ABS-CBN as advertisers lined up to sponsor the program. Thus, Eagle's Nest, the cooking segment was perennially sponsored by CMC Philippines (California Manufacturing Company; Unilever Bestfoods, currently a Unilever Philippines subsidiary), Nestlé or some other manufacturing food giant. There was also the Ginang Give Away portion sponsored by 3D or some other appliance manufacturer, the Superwheel Supermisis portion, the Sharp Washing Machine portion, etc.

The program also became a breeding ground for new talents to hone their skills on and off-camera. Eagle Riggs, Madame Rosa, and Dr. Holmes became household names. Arnell Ignacio, Giselle Sanchez, Dang Cruz and Mosang had their first taste of TV exposure in the program. Deo Endrinal is now the creative force behind ABS-CBN's biggest drama series. Enrico Santos, a creative genius in Star Cinema. The show produced Philippine television's best writers, executives and directors. Among the directors who started as the show's staff were Wenn V. Deramas, Don Cuaresma, Erick Salud, Connie Macatuno and Arnel Jacobe.

Up to its last day of airing on February 21, 1997, Teysi ng Tahanan was on top of its format and timeslot. The show folded up when its host, Tessie Tomas, after six years of the daily, live program grind, opted to slow down and spend more time with her British husband Roger Pullin. It was then replaced by Today with Kris Aquino.

Spin-off
Part of the 50th anniversary of Philippine television, Teysi ng Tahanan launched a spin-off talk show entitled Teysi, which premiered in August 2003 at 8:00am after Magandang Umaga, Bayan until it ended in early 2004 due to low ratings and when Magandang Umaga, Bayan extended its timeslot until 8:30am. The theme song of the show was revived upon the returning of the host 6 years after it ended.

Hosts

Main host
Tessie Tomas

Segment hosts
Jun Encarnacion
Eagle Riggs
Madame Rosa
Dang Cruz
Mosang
Dr. Margie Holmes
Gel Santos-Relos (reliever of Tessie Tomas)

Awards and recognitions
Winner, Best Woman Show - PMPC Star Awards for TV (1992-1996)
Winner, Best Woman Show Host - PMPC Star Awards for TV (1992-1996)

See also
List of shows previously aired by ABS-CBN
Katok Mga Misis

Philippine television talk shows
1991 Philippine television series debuts
1997 Philippine television series endings
ABS-CBN original programming
Filipino-language television shows